The Korvpalli Meistriliiga 2011-2012 (KML) was the eighty-eighth season of top-tier basketball in Estonia. The season began in October 2011 and ended on 17 May 2012. The defending champion BC Kalev/Cramo won its 5th league title.

Team information

Stadia and locations

Regular season

Play-offs

Play-off games
Quarter-finals

Semi-finals

3rd place play-off

Finals

Stats Leaders

Points

Rebounds

Assists

Awards

Regular season MVP
 Kaspars Cipruss – BC Rakvere Tarvas

Finals MVP
 Tanel Sokk – BC Kalev/Cramo

All-KML team

Best Coach
Aivar Kuusmaa – BC Kalev/Cramo

Best Young Player
Rait-Riivo Laane – Piimameister Otto/Rapla

Best Defensive Player
Bamba Fall – BC Kalev/Cramo

Player of the month 
{| class="wikitable sortable" style="text-align: center;"
! align="center"|Month
! align="center"|Player
! align="center"|Team
! align="center"|Source
|-
|October||align="left"| Janar Soo||Piimameister Otto/Rapla||
|-
|November||align="left"| Rait-Riivo Laane||Piimameister Otto/Rapla||
|-
|December||align="left"| Kaspars Cipruss||BC Rakvere Tarvas||
|-
|January||align="left"| Toomas Raadik||KK Pärnu||
|-
|February||align="left"| Valmo Kriisa||University of Tartu||
|-
|March||align="left"| Reinar Hallik||BC Rakvere Tarvas||

See also
VTB United League 2011–12
Baltic Basketball League 2011–12

References

External links 
 G4S Basketball Premier League

Korvpalli Meistriliiga seasons
Estonian
KML